Below are details of all the competitive matches played by Killarney RFC since 2002. They are listed season by season and arranged according to competition. They are compiled using data available from the Munster Junior Rugby website and also the Official Club Website.

2002/03 Season
The 2002/03 season was a disappointing one for Killarney. The club lost all their league matches finishing bottom of the Munster Junior League Division 3. They also lost their Munster Junior Cup game against Bandon and declined to make the long trip to Clonakilty for the Munster Junior Plate.
Munster Junior League Division 3 Final Table 2002/03

Munster Junior League Division 3 Results 2002/03

Munster Junior Cup Results 2002/03

Munster Junior Plate Results 2002/03

Munster Junior Clubs Challenge Cup Results 2002/03

2003/04 Season
The 2003/04 season was a much better season than the previous one for Killarney. They recorded 4 league wins and finished in 11th place in Division 3. They had a narrow victory over Presentation in the Munster Junior Clubs Challenge Cup, but were then no match for Old Christians in the next round.

Munster Junior League Division 3 Final Table 2003/04

Match Galbally v. Dunmanway not played

Munster Junior League Division 3 Results 2003/04

Munster Junior Cup Results 2003/04

Munster Junior Clubs Challenge Cup Results 2003/04

2004/05 Season
Despite the fact that Killarney won fewer games in the Munster Junior League this season than last they still finished two places higher up the table in 9th position. An impressive 19–9 away win in Kinsale was as good as it got as their only other victory was a narrow two-point win at home to Galbally. Their other 'win' was courtesy of a walkover from Dunmanway. They lost all four cup matches they played including a narrow defeat to neighbours Tralee in the Munster Junior Cup.

Munster Junior League Division 3 Final Table 2004/05

Match Galbally v. Carrick-on-Suir was not played

Munster Junior League Division 3 Results 2004/05

Munster Junior Cup Results 2004/05

Munster Junior Plate Results 2004/05

Munster Junior Clubs Challenge Cup Results 2004/05

Martin O'Sullivan Cup Results 2004/05

2005/06 Season
Killarney only lost 4 of their 8 league matches in 2005/06, but only winning 2 games meant they finished down in 8th place. The cup competitions were a massive disappointment. A 61–0 drubbing away to Bandon was followed by a 44–0 home defeat to Clonmel. The club didn't travel to Tanner Park to play Ballincollig in the Martin O'Sullivan Cup having already lost there to them in the league 46–0.

Munster Junior League Division 3 Final Table 2005/06

Munster Junior League Division 3 Results 2005/06

Match Kinsale v. Killarney was not played

Munster Junior Cup Results 2005/06

Munster Junior Plate Results 2005/06

Munster Junior Clubs Challenge Cup Results 2005/06

Martin O'Sullivan Cup Results 2005/06

McElligott Cup Final Table 2005/06

McElligott Cup Results 2005/06

Match Killarney v. Abbeyfeale not played

Galwey Foley Cup 2005/06

2006/07 Season
The 2006/07 season was a very disappointing one for Killarney. Winning only 2 league matches meant they finished down in 8th place. Both wins were away from home against the bottom 2, Dungarvan and Presentation. After losing away to Charleville in the Munster Junior Cup they declined to enter the Munster Junior Plate, giving Waterford City a walkover. Killarney were a little unfortunate in the Martin O'Sullivan Cup, drawing 17 all with Fermoy they lost out on try count.

Munster Junior League Division 3 Final Table 2006/07

Matches Presentation v. Charleville and Waterford City v. Galbally not played

Munster Junior League Division 3 Results 2006/07

Munster Junior Cup Results 2006/07

Munster Junior Plate Results 2006/07

Munster Junior Clubs Challenge Cup Results 2006/07

Martin O'Sullivan Cup Results 2006/07

Fermoy win on try count

2007/08 Season
A mid-table finish for Killarney in 2007/08 was a marked improvement on the previous season's league campaign with the highlight being a 22–5 victory over Carrick-on-Suir at Christmas. Indeed, the Tipperary side declined to travel to Dirreen again when the sides were drawn to play each other in the Munster Junior Plate. That walkover did no favours for Killarney as they were no match for Senior side Sunday's Well in the next round. Killarney had a good 24–0 win over Waterford City in the Munster Junior Clubs Challenge Cup, but suffered a heavy defeat to Kinsale in the next round. The club's final game of the season was a disappointing trip to East Clare to play Scariff in the Martin O'Sullivan Cup.

Munster Junior League Division 3 Final Table 2007/08

Munster Junior League Division 3 Results 2007/08

Match Galbally v. Killarney was not played

Munster Junior Cup Results 2007/08

Munster Junior Plate Results 2007/08

Munster Junior Clubs Challenge Cup Results 2007/08

Martin O'Sullivan Cup Results 2007/08

2008/09 Season
The 2008/09 season was a very successful season for Killarney, with the club almost clinching a league play-off place, reaching the semi-finals of the Martin O'Sullivan Cup and beating Shannon in the Munster Junior Plate. Division 3 of the Munster Junior League was divided into two sections for the 2008/09 season with the top two teams in each section going into a play-off to gain promotion. Having begun the league campaign with four straight defeats, it looked like being a disastrous season for Killarney, however with the appointment of Bill Stack as coach, fortunes changed immediately and the club won seven league matches in a row. With one game to go Killarney were on the verge of securing a top two spot. Their final match was away to rivals Castleisland who had already secured top spot. Killarney needed a win and were leading 18–14 when the game went into injury time. Then Castleisland scored a breakaway try to lead by a point. Killarney did have a chance to win the match but a long range penalty with the last kick of the game was missed.

The highlight of the season was almost certainly the 13–12 victory over Shannon in the Munster Junior Plate. This match was won by a late Seán Hickey penalty which sparked scenes of great celebrations on the touchline. The club also had a great run in the Martin O'Sullivan Cup where they reached the semi-finals, however the long trip to Kilbarry wasn't fruitful and they lost 22–6 to Waterford City.

Off the field plans were under way to secure a permanent home for the club instead of their rented home and several sites were being looked at as possibilities with the hope that one would be secured by the end of 2009.

Munster Junior League Division 3A Final Table 2008/09

*Scariff deducted 4 points for giving a walkover.
Match Killorglin v. St. Mary's not played.

Play-off semi-finals
Castleisland 3–6 Galbally
Carrick-on-Suir 14–18 St. Mary's
Galbally and St. Mary's promoted to Division 2

Division 3 Final
Galbally 43–3 St. Mary's

Munster Junior League Division 3A Results 2008/09

Munster Junior Cup Results 2008/09

Munster Junior Plate Results 2008/09

Martin O'Sullivan Cup Results 2008/09

2009/10 Season
The 2009/10 season will long be remembered by players and supporters of Killarney. The club was able to field a 2nd XV for the first time to compete in the Munster J2 League, a location for the club's permanent home was secured (subject to Council planning permission), 4 members of the Under 17 squad were selected on the Munster Under 17 panel (and 1 more on the reserves) but more importantly the club gained promotion to Division 2 of the Munster Junior League. The club's aim to improve on last season's performance by winning promotion almost came asunder as the season drew to a close when they surprisingly lost to neighbours Killorglin. Then followed a must win game away to Abbeyfeale where the team put in one of the performances of the season to overturn a half-time deficit to win 19–6. A comfortable bonus-point win at home to Corca Dhuibhne secured the play-off place.

The play-off away to Charleville was an enthralling and nerve-racking tie. A tough match with little or nothing between the sides looked like slipping away from Killarney despite two excellent tries from Gene McCarthy and Brian O'Sullivan, when they conceded a late penalty which was converted to leave Charleville 20–18 in front. Then with the final play of the match Killarney's forwards advanced towards the goal line and when a penalty was conceded by the home side, Seán Hickey converted with the last kick of the game to spark wild celebrations. A week later another tough encounter with perennial rivals Castleisland in the Division 3 Final resulted in a 9–3 defeat but it was only a slight blemish on a great season on the field. The club went on an end of season tour to Acqui Terme in northern Italy to participate in the Guido Erodio Memorial Tournament and ended up winning the competition. Off the field however Kerry County Council's decision to refuse the Club planning permission in March was a major disappointment.

1ST XV
Munster Junior League Division 3A Final Table

Matches Corca Dhuibhne v. Castleisland and Killorglin v. Kilrush not played

Division 3 Play-off semi-finals
Castleisland 16–13 Mallow (after extra-time)
Charleville 20–21 Killarney
Castleisland and Killarney promoted to Division 2

Division 3 Final
Castleisland 9–3 Killarney

Munster Junior League Division 3A Results

Munster Junior League Division 3 Play-offs

Munster Junior Cup Results

Munster Junior Plate Results

Martin O'Sullivan Cup Results

*Match was played at Crageens because Killarney's ground was unavailable

2ND XV
Munster Junior Two League (South) Section A Final Table

Munster Junior Two League (South) Section A Results

Note: The match Killarney v. Kanturk was cancelled
This fixture was reversed because Killarney's ground was unavailable for the initial home fixture
George O’Connell Cup Group A Final Table

George O'Connell Cup Group A Results

Munster South Junior Two Cup Results

2010/11 Season
Following from the success of the previous season it was hard to imagine that the 2010/11 season would be even more successful. Continuing on their fine league form from their promotion a very creditable top half finish in Division 2 was almost seen as a little disappointing given that some results should have been better and a top 4 finish could have been achieved. However the crowning moment of the season was unquestionably the victory over Newport in the Final of the Munster Junior Plate at Musgrave Park. That 10–3 win culminated a run of 7 straight wins in all competitions and marked the club's first major provincial title. A tough final which saw long time servant Adrian Hegarty get the game's only try followed earlier victories against Dungarvan, Kanturk and Castleisland, all played away from home.

There was also a vast improvement in the fortunes of the 2nd XV who narrowly missed out on a League play-off spot. Their success was instrumental in maintaining the high standards achieved by the 1st XV. And with ever-increasing numbers at senior level the future looks bright for the club.

Elsewhere the young talent of the club came to the fore at international level with hooker Cillian Walsh making his Irish debut for the Ireland youths and received an Honorary Life Membership from the Club. Also the Club finally secured a site for its new home at Aghadoe, Killarney with work expected to commence by the year's end.

1ST XV
Munster Junior League Division 2 Final Table

Matches Ennis v. Killarney & Newcastle West v. Galbally not played

Munster Junior League Division 2 Results

Munster Junior Cup 2011 Results

Munster Junior Plate 2011 Results

Munster Junior Clubs Shield 2010 Results

Starting XV v. Newport (Munster Junior Plate Final 10/4/2011)

2ND XV
Munster Junior Two League (South) Section A Final Table

Tralee qualify for Phase 2 of Munster Junior Two League
Listowel & Kenmare advance to Mick Barry Cup
Castleisland, Killarney & Iveragh Eagles advance to George O'Connell Cup

Munster Junior Two League (South) Section A Results

George O'Connell Cup Group B Final Table

Match Killarney v. Castleisland not played

George O'Connell Cup Group B Results

Munster Junior Two Cup 2011 Results

Dave Dineen Cup 2011

Galwey-Foley Cup 2011

*Match played at Dirreen because Iveragh Eagles' pitch was unplayable

Paul Twomey Cup 2011

2011/12

Squad 2011/12

1st XV

Starting XV v. Kinsale (25/03/2012)

Munster Junior League Division 2 Final Table

Munster Junior League Division 2 Results

Munster Junior Cup 2011-12 

Munster Junior Clubs Shield 2011

McElligott Cup 2011

{{Round8

|28 August Langford St.|Killorglin|--|Castleisland|w/o
|||||
|||||
|||||

|4 September Crageens|Castleisland|5|Killarney|6|28 August Baile Loisce|Corca Dhuibhne|13|Tralee|12

|1 October Crageens|Killarney|23|Corca Dhuibhne|3

|||||

|RD1=First Round|RD2=Semi-Finals|RD3=Final|consol=Third|3rdplace=no|color=800000|

|skipmatch01=no|skipmatch02=yes|skipmatch03=yes|skipmatch04=yes
}}

2nd XVStarting XV v. Iveragh Eagles (15/01/2012)Munster Junior Two League (South) Section A Final TableTralee advance to Phase 2 of J2 League
Killarney and Iveragh Eagles qualify for Mick Barry CupMunster Junior Two League (South) Section A ResultsMick Barry Cup Group A Final TableMick Barry Cup Group A ResultsMunster Junior Two Cup ResultDave Dineen CupFixtures / ResultsGalwey-Foley Cup 2011/12'''

References

External links
 Munster Junior Rugby
 Official Club Website
 Local News
 Killarney RFC on facebook

Rugby union clubs in County Kerry